Ippadikku En Kadhal is a 2007 Indian Tamil language romantic drama film directed by B. Kishore. The film stars newcomers Ravi Kalyan and Thanuja, with J. Livingston, Sethu Vinayagam, Ajay Rathnam, Kovai Senthil, S. Ramakrishnan, Balasubramanian, Chitti Babu, Ravi Shanth, Keerthana and Sabitha Anand playing supporting roles. The film, produced by A. S. Ravisankar, was released in 19 October 2007.

Plot

The film begins with Cheran (Ravi Kalyan), who hails from Coimbatore, joining a college in Chennai as a first-year student. Cheran is an orphan and a studious student, he stays in a hostel with his newly made friend (Ravi Shanth). His collegemate Madhavi (Thanuja), daughter of the businessman Chidambaram (S. Ramakrishnan), falls in love with Cheran but she is unable to declare her love. Vilvanathan (J. Livingston), the English professor, is a womanizer and blackmails the college girls to have sex with him. The next victim of Vilvanathan is none other than Madhavi and he tries to get rid of her lover Cheran.

Vilvanathan sends rowdies to kidnap Cheran, the rowdies bring him to the hospital and they force an honest doctor (Ajay Rathnam) to perform a lobotomy on him. The next day, Cheran returns to his college in a persistent vegetative state and all the students are in shock, as it turns out Cheran was acting. Cheran then beats up Vilvanathan's goons and saves the doctor from them. At her birthday function, Madhavi kisses Cheran on the lips and he slaps her in turn.

In the past, Cheran's elder brother (Balasubramanian) married his lover (Keerthana). The eight-year-old Cheran lived so far with his widow mother (Sabitha Anand), his brother and his sister-in-law. His sister-in-law wanted to live with her husband only, so she forces Cheran's brother to move to an orphanage and his mother, to an old-age home. Since that day, Cheran hated love.

Back to the present, Cheran finally finds his mother and she was living all along in Madhavi's house. Meanwhile, Vilvanathan kidnaps Madhavi and decides to rape her on the college campus. Cheran who finds out about the abduction exposes Vilvanathan's true face to the college principal (Sethu Vinayagam), professors and students. Overcome by embarrassment, guilt and fear, Vilvanathan hangs himself in a classroom. The film ends with Cheran accepting Madhavi's love.

Cast

Ravi Kalyan as Cheran
Thanuja as Madhavi
J. Livingston as Vilvanathan
Sethu Vinayagam as College principal
Ajay Rathnam as Doctor
Kovai Senthil as Tamil professor
S. Ramakrishnan as Chidambaram
Balasubramanian as Cheran's brother
Chitti Babu as Mani
Ravi Shanth as Velu
Keerthana as Cheran's sister-in-law
Sabitha Anand as Cheran's mother
Sivaranjani
Niranjan
Gopal as Gopal
Sundar
A. Vijayaprakash
Megha
Master Ashwin as Young Cheran
Madurai Saroja as Thayamma
Abhinayashree in a special appearance
Vandar Kuzhazhi Smitha in a special appearance

Production
B. Kishore made his directorial debut with Ippadikku En Kadhal under the banner of A. R. Film. Newcomer Ravi Kalyan was chosen to play the lead role while newcomer Thanuja, the winner of Miss Tamil Nadu 2003, was selected to play the heroine. Actresses Abhinayashree and Vandar Kuzhazhi Smitha signed to dance in an item number.

Soundtrack

The film score and the soundtrack were composed by Vimalraj. The soundtrack features five tracks written by Muthu Vijayan, R. Jothivaanan and M. M. Balachandran.

References

2007 films
2000s Tamil-language films
2007 romantic drama films
Indian romantic drama films
Films set in universities and colleges
2007 directorial debut films